Periboeum vicinum is a species of beetle in the family Cerambycidae. It was described by Perroud in 1855.

References

Elaphidiini
Beetles described in 1855